The Azrieli Sarona Tower is a skyscraper in the Sarona neighborhood, Tel Aviv, Israel, on Begin Road. It is the tallest building in Israel, followed by Ramat Gan's 235-meter-high Moshe Aviv Tower.

Construction history

In May 2011, the Azrieli Group acquired the land plot for ILS ₪ 522 million via tender from the Israel Land Administration. In 2012 the Azrieli Group appealed the Regional Committee for Planning and Construction of the Tel Aviv District, asking to transfer  to increase the area for commercial use. The committee accepted the request, but demanded that an eighth garage floor will be built. Due to the expected high price (₪70 million) and the increased construction time, a compromise was achieved and instead of an eighth garage floor, 500 of the parking spots will be designated for public use and the residents of Tel Aviv will not pay any price higher than the price charged in parking stations owned by the municipality of Tel Aviv. The seven-story underground garage has a total of 1,600 parking spots, and the commercial center is spread over the first three floors. At the 33rd to 37th floor, a hotel will be built.

The cornerstone was placed by David Azrieli in a ceremony on 12 March 2012. In June 2016, 60% of the tower were already leased.

Hotel
In 2015 the Azrieli Group signed an agreement with Africa Israel Investments, leasing the 33rd to 37th floors for the period of 20 years for the establishment of a business hotel. "The hotel will have 160 rooms and will be separated from the office floors, will have separate elevators and will have an independent lobby with a restaurant and a business lounge."Said a spokesperson for the group. Africa Israel Investment paid ₪250 million for the agreement and will invest another ₪50 million in the construction.

See also
 Azrieli Center

References

Skyscrapers in Tel Aviv
Skyscraper office buildings in Israel
Skyscraper hotels